Brushy Creek, also known as Vardry McBee House and Alexander McBee House, is a historic home located at Greenville, South Carolina. It was built about 1836 as a -story, frame farmhouse. In 1924, the house was expanded with the addition of a one-story frame room, that incorporated the formerly separate kitchen into the house itself. Further renovations were made in 1938–1939 and 1951. Also on the property are a log barn, a brick shed, a well house, and the ruins of a grist mill. It was the home of Vardry McBee (1775–1864), prominent 19th-century businessman, entrepreneur, and delegate to the Secession Convention of Greenville District known as the “Father of Greenville,” and his son Alexander McBee (1822–1897), prominent 19th-century businessman, banker, and state representative of Greenville District.

It was added to the National Register of Historic Places in 1999.

References

Houses on the National Register of Historic Places in South Carolina
Houses completed in 1836
Houses in Greenville, South Carolina
National Register of Historic Places in Greenville, South Carolina